"She Drives Me Crazy" is a song by English group Fine Young Cannibals, released in 1988 as the first single from their second and final album, The Raw & the Cooked (1989). Peaking at No. 5 on the British singles chart in January 1989, it is the band's highest charting single in their native UK. The single proved an even bigger hit in the US, topping the Billboard Hot 100 on 15 April 1989 for one week and becoming the first of two chart-topping singles for the band on that chart. "She Drives Me Crazy" also reached No.1 on the Billboard Hot Dance Music/Club Play Singles chart, as well as in countries including Australia, Austria, Canada, New Zealand and Spain. It reached the top 3 on several European charts including Belgium, West Germany, Iceland, Ireland and Switzerland.

In 2018, Time Out magazine listed "She Drives Me Crazy" at No. 28 in their countdown of The 50 best '80s songs.

Background and recording
Co-produced by Prince associate David Z, the track was recorded in Studio B of Prince's Paisley Park complex outside of Minneapolis. The unique snare drum "pop" sound was created by recording the snare drum portion separately. A speaker was then placed on top of the snare drum, and a microphone below. The original recording of the snare drum part was played back through the speaker and re-recorded.

Critical reception
Jo-Ann Greene from AllMusic stated that the song "features the most unique, and instantly identifiable, beat/riff combination of the decade." The Daily Vault's Christopher Thelen noted that "She Drives Me Crazy", "with its synthesized drums, was a great party song - Gift's falsetto delivery which went into a full-fledged roar was perfect for the track. Even the guitar work fits the track - from the jangly jazz riffs to the crunch of the power chords." Pan-European magazine Music & Media described it as a "subtly persuasive pop number that is sure to attract major airplay on pop and rock radio." Pop Rescue called it a "real gem with plenty of guitar, interesting vocals and beeping synth layers." Andy Strickland from Record Mirror wrote, "Always interesting, always a few surprises and this is no exception from the bandy trio. A stuttering pop record that's too slow to dance to and too fast to smooch to. The FYCs always sprinkle some interesting sounds over their records and here we have funky guitar breaks, heavy metal chords and plenty of things going boing, clicky click ding." James Hamilton from the magazine's DJ Directory deemed it a "haunting sparse jittery tapped then chunky rock guitar chorded whinneying falsetto 108½bpm lurcher".

Music video
Two music videos were produced for the song, one by Philippe Decouflé and another by Pedro Romhanyi. 

The video received several nominations at the 1989 MTV Video Music Awards, including "Best Video".

Re-release

The song was re-released in 1997 in support of Fine Young Cannibals' compilation album The Finest. It included a remix by Roger Sanchez, as well as Mousse T. remixes of "Johnny Come Home". The single reached No. 36 on the UK singles chart.

Track listings
 7" single
 "She Drives Me Crazy" – 3:35
 "Pull the Sucker Off" – 3:34

 12" single
 "She Drives Me Crazy" (David Z Remix) - 7:05
 "She Drives Me Crazy" (Driven Crazy Dub) - 5:33
 "She Drives Me Crazy (Justin Strauss Remix) - 7:39
 "She Drives Me Crazy (Single Remix) - 3:48

 CD maxi
 "She Drives Me Crazy" - 3:35
 "Pull the Sucker Off" - 3:37
 "Tired of Getting Pushed Around" (The Mayhem Rhythm Remix) - 6:37

 CD maxi (1997 Re-release)
 "She Drives Me Crazy" (Original 7") - 3:36
 "She Drives Me Crazy" (Roger Sanchez Radio Edit) - 3:33
 "Johnny Come Home" (Mousse T. Edit) - 4:06
 "Johnny Come Home" (Mousse T. Cocktail Mix) - 4:13

Personnel 

 Roland Gift – vocals
 Andy Cox – guitar
 David Steele – bass, keyboards, drum machine

Charts

Weekly charts

Year-end charts

Certifications

References

1988 singles
1988 songs
Billboard Hot 100 number-one singles
Cashbox number-one singles
Fine Young Cannibals songs
I.R.S. Records singles
London Records singles
Music videos directed by Pedro Romhanyi
Number-one singles in Australia
Number-one singles in Austria
Number-one singles in New Zealand
Number-one singles in Spain
RPM Top Singles number-one singles
Songs written by David Steele (musician)
Songs written by Roland Gift